The Journey of Javier Heraud (Spanish: El viaje de Javier Heraud) is a 2019 Peruvian-Spanish biographical documentary film written and directed by Javier Corcuera.

Synopsis 
The documentary is a portrait of the Peruvian poet and guerrilla fighter Javier Heraud, who died at the age of 21 in Madre de Dios, a town in the Peruvian jungle, through the information and documents possessed by Ariarca Otero, Heraud's great-niece.

Release 
The film opened the 23rd Lima Film Festival on August 22, 2019. It was released on August 22, 2019 in Peruvian theaters.

References

External links 

 

2019 films
2019 documentary films
Peruvian biographical films
Peruvian documentary films
Spanish biographical films
Spanish documentary films
2010s Peruvian films
2010s Spanish films
2010s Spanish-language films